Meliz Redif (born March 26, 1989, Nicosia) is a Turkish Cypriot female sprinter/track runner. She is a native of Northern Cyprus.  Meliz Redif is a member of Fenerbahce Sport Club athletics team. In 2015 she was banned from sport for three years after abnormal deviations in her biological passport profile were found.

She won a gold medal in the 4 × 400 m relay event at the First League of 2011 European Team Championships held in Izmir, Turkey and a silver medal in the same event at the 2011 Summer Universiade held in Shenzhen, China.

Doping 
In 2015 Redif was banned from sport for three years after abnormal deviations in her biological passport profile were found.

Achievements

References

External links
IAAF profile for Meliz Redif

1989 births
Sportspeople from North Nicosia
Living people
Turkish female sprinters
Fenerbahçe athletes
Athletes (track and field) at the 2012 Summer Olympics
Olympic athletes of Turkey
Doping cases in athletics
Turkish sportspeople in doping cases
Universiade medalists in athletics (track and field)
Universiade silver medalists for Turkey
Medalists at the 2011 Summer Universiade
Olympic female sprinters
Turkish Cypriot expatriate sportspeople in Turkey
Turkish Cypriot women